Dawson High School may refer to:
 Dawson Junior / Senior High School (Dawson, Texas), a High School in Texas
 Glenda Dawson High School in Pearland, Texas
 Dawson County High School in Glendive, Montana
 Dawson High School (Welch, Texas)